Joe Hamm (born November 1, 1950 in St. Louis, Missouri) is a former U.S. soccer player who was a member of the U.S. soccer team at the 1972 Summer Olympics.

College
Hamm began as a forward in high school.  He moved into the midfielder while playing for the St. Louis University Billikens from 1969 to 1972.  Hamm and his teammates won the 1969, 1970 and 1972 NCAA Men's Soccer Championship.  He was inducted into the St. Louis University Athletic Hall of Fame in 1995.

1972 Summer Olympics
Hamm joined the U.S. Olympic soccer team as it went through its qualification campaign for the 1972 Summer Olympics.  On April 16, 1972, he scored a goal in the 3–2 loss to Guatemala.  Despite the loss, the U.S. ultimately qualified for the games.  At the Olympics, the U.S. went 0-2-1 in group play and did not qualify for the second round.  Hamm did not play the first U.S. game, a tie, but came on for Buzz Demling in a 3–0 loss to Malaysia on August 29, 1972.  He then started and played the entire game in 7–0 loss to host West Germany.

He was inducted into the St. Louis Soccer Hall of Fame on November 1, 2001.

References

1950 births
Living people
American soccer players
Saint Louis University alumni
Saint Louis Billikens men's soccer players
Olympic soccer players of the United States
Footballers at the 1972 Summer Olympics
Soccer players from St. Louis
Association football midfielders